William Doran (12 November 1916 – 9 September 1973) was an English professional Grand Prix motorcycle road racer. Born in Tottington near Bury in Lancashire, he started racing in 1946, finishing in twenty-third position in his first Manx Grand Prix and placed second in the 1948 Senior TT race on private Nortons.

He became a works AJS rider from 1949, winning the 1949 Belgian Grand Prix on an AJS Porcupine, until his retirement after suffering a head injury in a serious crash in August 1953 at Rouen.

His best season was in 1951 when he won the Dutch TT and finished the year second to Geoff Duke in the 350cc world championship. Doran won two Grand Prix races during his career.

Doran had part of the Isle of Man TT course named after him. He was proud because, at the time of dedication, he was the only living recipient with a named section. He crashed during a Thursday evening practice for the 1952 Isle of Man TT riding an AJS motorcycle resulting in a broken leg. The accident occurred on the left-hand bend after Ballig Bridge and was renamed Doran's Bend.

In late 1952 at the London Motorcycle Show, Doran approached the Italian company Gilera for a works ride for the 1953 season. However, in a letter dated November 27, 1952 Gilera replied to the request stating the positions on their team were filled for the coming season so Doran started the 1953 season on his now obsolete AJS scoring three points paying finishes before the career ending crash at Rouen.

After retirement from racing in 1954 he opened a motorcycle business in Wellington, Shropshire, with former AJS race-chief Matt Wright, selling new motorcycles collected from the Birmingham factories in a pick-up vehicle driven by Doran's wife Peggy, daughter of Herbert Ratcliffe, whom he married in 1955. Isetta and Messerschmitt three-wheelers were also collected from Luton airport.

Partner Matt Wright retired in 1967, and with the demise of the British Motorcycle manufacturers, most notably BSA in 1971, Doran developed the business into a Yamaha, Suzuki and Lambretta dealership in addition to a FIAT car dealership, car repairs and petrol sales, with the later acquisition of two further nearby sites.

Known physically by his jutting chin, Doran died of a heart attack at his home, Carn Brea, Station Road, Admaston, near Wellington in September 1973 aged 56. After a funeral service at Wrockwardine Parish Church on 14 September 1973 he was cremated at Emstrey Crematorium, Shrewsbury.

Motorcycle Grand Prix results 
1949 point system:

Points system from 1950 to 1968:

5 best results were counted up until 1955.

(key) (Races in italics indicate fastest lap)

References

1916 births
1973 deaths
People from Southwark
People from Wellington, Shropshire
English motorcycle racers
350cc World Championship riders
500cc World Championship riders
Isle of Man TT riders